New Standards is an album by the American jazz trumpeter Malachi Thompson recorded and released by the Delmark label in 1993.

Reception

Allmusic reviewer Steven McDonald stated "New Standards takes on a nice variety of material ... The playing is entertainingly upbeat, keeping the music interesting even when Thompson and the band go off into improvisational wilds. Thompson's trumpet work is outstanding, entertaining and listenable without condescending to the production of light and fluffy jazz".

Track listing
 "Joshua" (Victor Feldman) – 6:38
 "Pinnoccio" (Wayne Shorter) – 8:25
 "Crescent" (John Coltrane) – 8:48
 "Resolution" (Coltrane) – 5:57
 "If I Only Had a Brain" (Harold Arlen, Yip Harburg) – 8:57
 "We Speak" (Booker Little) – 11:31
 "Dhyia Malika" (Malachi Thompson) – 8:25
 "Chicago Soundscapes" (Thompson) – 12:58

Personnel
Malachi Thompson – trumpet 
Steve Berry – trombone (tracks 1, 2 & 5-8)
Joe Ford – alto saxophone (tracks 5-8)
Ron Bridgewater (tracks 1 & 2), Carter Jefferson (tracks 5-8), Sonny Seals (tracks 3 & 4) – tenor saxophone
Kirk Brown – piano 
Yosef Ben Israel (tracks 1 & 2), John Whitfield (tracks 3-8) – bass
Nasar Abedey (tracks 3, 4, 7 & 8), Avreeayl Ra (tracks 1, 2, 5 & 6) – drums 
Dr. Cuz – percussion (track 8)

References

Delmark Records albums
1993 albums
Malachi Thompson albums
Albums produced by Bob Koester